The following is a list of political parties registered at the Ministry of Interior, Spain, from 1976-2002.

Note that:

 The Ministry does not appear to remove registrations if parties become inactive or are dissolved, and many of the groups no longer exist.
 Some of the groups were actually electoral alliances formed to contest a specific election.
 Some of the groups are regional affiliates or branches of a national party.
 Some of the organizations are actually the youth wings of larger political parties.
 Parties are listed by Spanish name, English name, by city, and in chronological order.
Reforma Social Española (Spanish Social Reform), Madrid, 1976-11-02
Partido Agrario Español (Spanish Agrarian Party), Madrid, 1976-10-04
Unión Democráta Cristiana (Christian Democratic Union), Madrid, 1976-11-02
Confederación de Partidos Conservadores (Confederation of Conservative Parties), Madrid, 1976-12-04
Partido Progresista (Progressive Party), Madrid, 1977-01-18
Comunión Tradicionalista Carlista (Carlist Traditionalist Communion), Madrid, 1977-02-09
Izquierda Democrática (Democratic Left), Madrid, 1977-02-17
Partido Liberal (Liberal Party), Madrid, 1977-02-17
Partido Socialista Obrero Español (Spanish Socialist Workers Party), Madrid, 1977-02-17
Falange Española Independiente (Independent Spanish Falange), Madrid, 1977-02-23
Partido Sindicalista (Syndicalist Party), Madrid, 1977-02-24
Federación de Alianza Popular (Popular Alliance Federation), Madrid, 1977-03-22
Federación de Partidos Socialistas (Federation of Socialist Parties), Madrid, 1977-04-01
Tradición Española (Spanish Tradition), Madrid, 1977-04-01
Partido Comunista de España (Communist Party of Spain), Madrid, 1977-04-09
Renovación Española (Spanish Renovation), Madrid, 1977-04-14
Federación de la Democracia Cristiana (Federation of the Christian Democracy), Madrid, 1977-04-19
Partido Reformista Independiente (Independent Reformist Party), Madrid, 1977-04-19
Partido Independientes de Madrid (Party Independents of Madrid), Madrid, 1977-04-29
Juntas de Ofensiva Nacional Sindicalista (Units of National Syndicalist Offensive), Galapagar, 1977-05-04
Partido Popular (People's Party), Madrid, 1977-05-04
Juntas de Acción Nacional Sindicalista (Units of National Syndicalist Action), Madrid, 1977-05-26
Partido Nacional y Andaluz Novena Provincia (National Party and 9th Andalusian Province), Madrid, 1977-06-18
Partido Carlista (Carlist Party), Madrid, 1977-07-14
Partido Liberal Español (Spanish Liberal Party), Madrid, 1977-07-19
Movimiento Comunista (Communist Movement), Madrid, 1977-07-21
Acción Republicana Democrática Española (Spanish Democratic Republican Action), Madrid, 1977-08-02
Partido Nacional Independiente (Independent National Party), Madrid, 1977-08-04
Unión de Centro Democrático (Union of the Democratic Centre), Madrid, 1977-08-12
Partido Conservador Español (Spanish Conservative Party), Madrid, 1977-09-16
Joven Guardia Roja de España (Young Red Guard of Spain), Madrid, 1977-09-19
Liga Comunista Revolucionaria (Revolutionary Communist League), Madrid, 1977-09-24
Organización de Izquierda Comunista (Communist Left Organization), Madrid, 1977-09-24
Federación de Juventudes Comunistas Revolucionarias (Revolutionary Communist Youth Federation), Madrid, 1977-09-29
Acción Comunista (Communist Action), Madrid, 1977-10-03
Unificación Comunista de España (Communist Unification of Spain), Madrid, 1977-10-05
Partido Comunista Obrero Español (Spanish Communist Workers Party), Madrid, 1977-10-28
Juventudes de Izquierda Comunista (Communist Left Youth), Madrid, 1977-10-31
Partido Obrero Internacionalista (Internationalist Workers Party), Madrid, 1977-10-31
Izquierda Republicana (Republican Left), Madrid, 1977-11-10
Unión de Juventudes Maoistas (Maoist Youth Union), Madrid, 1977-11-28
Unión Centrista Liberal (Liberal Centrist Union), Madrid, 1978-03-28
Cambio Ecologista y Social o Partido Ecologista (Ecologist and Social Change or Ecologist Party), Madrid, 1978-03-29
Acción Ciudadana Liberal (Liberal Citizens Action), Madrid, 1978-04-20
Partido Republicano Federal Socialista (Socialist Federal Republican Party), Madrid, 1978-04-24
Unión Carlista (Carlist Union), Madrid, 1978-04-24
Acción Social Democráta Española (Spanish Social Democratic Action), Madrid, 1978-05-17
Frente Nacional de Alianza Libre (National Free Alliance Front), Madrid, 1978-07-31
Frente de la Juventud (Youth Front), Madrid, 1978-11-30
Partido Obrero y Campesino (Workers and Peasants Party), Madrid, 1979-01-02
Unión para la Libertad de Expresión (Union for the Freedom of Expression), Madrid, 1979-01-10
Organización de Profesionales de España (Organization of Professionals of Spain), Madrid, 1979-01-16
Falange Española Auténtica (Authentic Spanish Falange), Madrid, 1979-01-17
Partido Social Democráta (Social Democratic Party), Madrid, 1979-04-19
Confederación Rural Española (Spanish Rural Confederation), Madrid, 1979-06-07
Juventudes Nacional Revolucionarias (Revolutionary National Youth), Madrid, 1979-07-17
Unión Castellano-Manchega (Castilian-Manchego Union), Madrid, 1979-07-19
Partido Radical (Radical Party), Madrid, 1979-07-20
Frente para la Unidad Falangista (Front for Falangist Unity), Madrid, 1979-07-23
Partido de los Trabajadores de España (Workers Party of Spain), Madrid, 1979-07-24
Acción Nacional Progresista (Progressive National Action), Madrid, 1980-01-29
Democracia Conservadora Independiente (Independent Conservative Democracy), Madrid, 1980-01-30
Partido Socialista de los Trabajadores (Socialist Workers Party), Madrid, 1980-02-16
Centristas Españoles o Centristas de España (Spanish Centrists or Centrists of Spain), Madrid, 1980-04-18
Partido Comunista de España Unificado (Unified Communist Party of Spain), Madrid, 1980-06-16
Movimiento Falangista de España (Falangist Movement of Spain), Madrid, 1980-10-01
Trabajadores Autogestionarios Socialistas (Socialist Selfmanaging Workers), Getafe, 1980-12-10
Partido Comunista de España (Congresos VIII y IX) (Communist Party of Spain (8th and 9th Congress), Madrid, 1981-02-13
Partido Comunista de España (Marxista-Leninista) (Communist Party of Spain (Marxist–Leninist)), Madrid, 1981-02-18
Cultura Natural (Natural Culture), Madrid, 1981-03-04
Partido Feminista de España (Feminist Party of Spain), Madrid, 1981-03-04
Unión Socialdemócrata y Liberal (Social Democratic and Liberal Union), Madrid, 1981-03-18
Acción de los Electores Independientes (Independent Voters Action), Collado Villalba, 1981-08-27
Social Democracia Española (Spanish Social Democracy), Madrid, 1981-09-11
Federación de Partidos Socialdemócratas y de Partidos Liberales (Federation of Social Democratic Parties and Liberal Parties), Madrid, 1981-11-24
Jóvenes por el Socialismo (Youth for Socialism), Madrid, 1981-12-28
Movimiento Católico Español (Spanish Catholic Movement), Madrid, 1982-01-25
Izquierda para el Socialismo (Izquierda Socialista) (Left for Socialism (Socialist Left)), Madrid, 1982-02-15
Unión Independiente de Pinto (Independent Union of Pinto), Pinto, 1982-04-27
Grupo de Radicales en Madrid (Group of Radicals in Madrid), Madrid, 1982-06-21
Democracia Cristiana (Christian Democracy), Madrid, 1982-07-28
Solidaridad Española (Spanish Solidarity), Madrid, 1982-08-18
Partido de Acción Socialista (Socialist Action Party), Madrid, 1982-08-20
Centro Democrático y Social (Democratic and Social Centre), Madrid, 1982-08-23
Convención Republicana de los Pueblos de España (Republican Convention of the Peoples of Spain), Madrid, 1982-09-14
Partido Verde (Green Party), Madrid, 1982-09-24
Partido de Recuperación y Unificación Comunista (Communist Recuperation and Unification Party), Madrid, 1982-10-15
Partido Liberal Progresista (Progressive Liberal Party), Madrid, 1982-12-23
Movimiento de Recuperación del Partido Comunista de España, Firmantes del Documento de los 200 (Movement of Recuperation of the Communist Party of Spain, Signatories of the Document of the 200), Madrid, 1982-12-29
Partido Democráta Liberal de Madrid (Liberal Democratic Party of Madrid), Madrid, 1983-01-13
Movimiento de Izquierdas de Alcalá (Left Movement of Alcalá), Alcalá de Henares, 1983-02-16
Agrupación de Independientes de El Escorial (Grouping of Independents of El Escorial), El Escorial, 1983-03-11
Partido Reformista Democrático (Democratic Reformist Party), Madrid, 1983-03-11
Partido Comunista de los Pueblos de España (Communist Party of the Peoples of Spain), Madrid, 1983-03-15
Vida y Progreso (Life and Progress), Madrid, 1983-03-16
Partido Liberal Reformista (Liberal Reformist Party), Madrid, 1983-03-22
Confederación de Radicales (Confederation of Radicals), Madrid, 1983-05-04
Partido de Acción Liberal (Liberal Action Party), Madrid, 1983-07-07
Partido Obrero Socialista Internacionalista (Internationalist Socialist Workers Party), Madrid, 1984-03-13
Partido Humanista (Humanist Party), Madrid, 1984-05-16
Patria Libre (Free Motherland), Madrid, 1984-07-07
Solución Independiente (Independent Solution), Madrid, 1984-08-14
Los Verdes (The Greens), Madrid, 1984-11-23
Federación Progresista (Progressive Federation), Madrid, 1984-12-13
Unión Liberal (Liberal Union), Madrid, 1985-07-05
Partido Comunista de España (Marxista Revolucionario) (Communist Party of Spain (Marxist-Revolutionary), San Sebastian de los Reyes, 1985-10-09
Unidad Comunista (Communist Unity), San Sebastian de los Reyes, 1985-10-09
Unidad por la Paz y el Socialismo (Unity for Peace and Socialism), Madrid, 1985-10-31
Partido Español Cristiano (Spanish Christian Party), Madrid, 1985-12-03
Acción Social (Social Action), Madrid, 1986-03-21
Partido al Servicio del Pueblo (Party for Service to the Town), Madrid, 1986-04-23
Futuro Verde (Green Future), Madrid, 1986-05-14
Juntas Españolas, Madrid, 1986-06-27
Partido Socialista Federal (Federal Socialist Party), Madrid, 1986-07-01
Partido Progresista Democrático Español (Progressive Spanish Democratic Party), Madrid, 1986-11-07
Partido Comunista de Andalucía (Communist Party of Andalucia), Madrid, 1986-11-13
Partido Comunista de Asturias (Communist Party of Asturias), Madrid, 1986-11-13
Partido Comunista de Cantabria (Communist Party of Cantabria), Madrid, 1986-11-13
Partido Comunista de Castilla-La Mancha (Communist Party of Castile-La Mancha), Madrid, 1986-11-13
Partido Comunista de Castilla-León (Communist Party of Castile-León), Madrid, 1986-11-13
Partido Comunista de Extremadura (Communist Party of Extremadura), Madrid, 1986-11-13
Partido Comunista de Galicia (Communist Party of Galicia), Madrid, 1986-11-13
Partido Comunista de la Región Murciana (Communist Party of the Murciana Region), Madrid, 1986-11-13
Partido Comunista de la Rioja (Communist Party of the Rioja), Madrid, 1986-11-13
Partido Comunista de las Islas Baleares (Communist Party of the Balearic Islands), Madrid, 1986-11-13
Partido Comunista de Madrid-Región (Communist Party of the Madrid Region), Madrid, 1986-11-13
Los Verdes de la Comunidad de Madrid (The Greens of the Community of Madrid), Madrid, 1986-12-04
Renovación Democrática (Democratic Renovation), Madrid, 1986-12-04
Partido Democráta (Democratic Party), Madrid, 1986-12-15
Movimiento Nacional 18 de Julio, Madrid, 1987-01-13
Agrupación Autonómica Independiente de Madrid, Madrid, 1987-04-07
Gente del Pueblo, Madrid, 1987-04-14
Iniciativa per Catalunya-Verds, Madrid, 1987-04-14
Plataforma de la Nueva Izquierda, Madrid, 1987-04-14
Grupo Independiente de Fresnedillas de la Oliva, Fresnedillas de la Oliva,  1987-04-27
Partido Republicano Socialista, Madrid, 1987-04-27
Partido del Progreso de Europa, Madrid, 1987-04-28
Partido Liberal Renovado, Madrid, 1987-10-27
Los Verdes Ecologistas, Madrid, 1987-11-30
Unidad Nacional Castellana, Madrid, 1988-01-04
Partido Liberal Popular, Madrid, 1988-03-22
Partido de Madrid, Madrid, 1988-07-07
Partido Regional Independiente Madrileño, Algete, 1988-07-07
Partido Progresista Español, Madrid, 1988-12-12
Iniciativa para Una Democracia Europea, Madrid, 1989-04-13
Lista Verde, Madrid, 1989-07-12
Coordinadora para el Socialismo y la Integración, Madrid, 1989-07-13
Partido del Trabajo y Empleo-Agrupación Ruiz Mateos "Trabajo y Empleo", Madrid, 1989-08-30
Grupo Independiente, Pinto, 1989-12-12
Centro Progresista, Madrid, 1990-02-09
Democracia Socialista, Madrid, 1990-05-25

Madrid
 
Political parties
Political parties, Madrid